Nikita Metlitskiy (born 6 February 1995) is a Belarusian professional footballer who plays for Yuni Minsk.

References

External links 
 
 

1995 births
Living people
Belarusian footballers
Association football midfielders
FC Smorgon players
FC Krumkachy Minsk players
FC Granit Mikashevichi players
FC Chist players
FC Molodechno players